is a Japanese footballer currently playing as a midfielder for Ehime FC in the J3 League.

Club career
Born in Yamaguchi Prefecture, Yukutomo started his career with Renofa Yamaguchi, before moving to Ehime FC. He scored his first goal for the club on his debut, having come on as a substitute in a 2–1 loss to Iwaki FC. He scored his second goal in a 2–1 win against SC Sagamihara in his third match, on April 2022, scoring Ehime's winner. His third goal came in the same season on 28 October 2022, against Tegevajaro Miyazaki, coming from the bench to tie the match 3–3. In his first 5 matches at a professional level, he scored 3 goals, despite having only played 51 minutes of action in the 5 matches combined.

Career statistics

Club
.

References

2005 births
Living people
Association football people from Yamaguchi Prefecture
Japanese footballers
Association football midfielders
J3 League players
Renofa Yamaguchi FC players
Ehime FC players